James Sidney Dean Rawlings (5 May 1913 – 1956) was a professional footballer, who played for Preston North End, Huddersfield Town, West Bromwich Albion, Northampton Town, Millwall and Plymouth Argyle (1946/47 & 1947/48 seasons). He was born in Wombwell, West Riding of Yorkshire.

Rawlings played for Everton FC during World War II having initially played on loan from Millwall and then signing permanently in 1940. He also made a few guest appearances for Liverpool. Previous to his move to Everton he had played in Millwall's run to the final of Football League War Cup, which they lost to Chelsea in front of a Wembley crowd of 90,000. After ending his professional career at Plymouth Argyle he continued to play locally for Tavistock and subsequently managed them for a short period. He died in 1956 from leukemia.

Film still exists on the web of Sid training with the Millwall players as covered by Pathe News. Photographs also exist of the Millwall semi-final, showing where Rawlings and the other players being presented to the King prior to the match.

References

1913 births
1956 deaths
English footballers
People from Wombwell
Association football midfielders
English Football League players
Preston North End F.C. players
Huddersfield Town A.F.C. players
West Bromwich Albion F.C. players
Northampton Town F.C. players
Millwall F.C. players
Plymouth Argyle F.C. players
Rochdale A.F.C. wartime guest players